Guepiniopsis alpina, commonly known as the jelly cup, alpine jelly cone, or poor man's gumdrop, is a species of fungus in the family Dacrymycetaceae. The small, gelatinous Fruit bodies are orange and cone or cup shaped. Found in western North America and Iran, the fungus grows on decaying conifer wood.

Taxonomy

The fungus was first described in 1901 by Samuel Mills Tracy and Franklin Sumner Earle under the name Guepinia alpina in 1901. It was later transferred to Heterotextus in 1932, and then to Guepiniopsis in 1938.

It is commonly known as the "jelly cup", "alpine jelly cone", or "poor man's gumdrop".

Description

They are bright yellow to orange, with a gelatinous texture and a smooth and sticky surface on top, but have external hairs. Dried fruit bodies deepen to reddish-orange and become hard. Basidiospores are produced on the inner surface of the cup. In mass, the spores are yellowish. They are sausage shaped, measure 11–18 by 4–6 µm, and have three or four septa. Like all members of the Dacrymycetes, the basidia are Y-shaped.

The edibility of G. alpina is unknown, but it is too small to be considered for the table. It has been claimed to be edible, but tastes bland at best. One guide classifies it as inedible.

Species with which G. alpina could be confused include Bisporella citrina, Dacrymyces capitatus, and D. stillatus. Guepiniopsis chrysocomus is a related species with a somewhat similar appearance. It has a yellow fruit body, larger spores, and uses rotting hardwood as a substrate.

Habitat and distribution

The fruit bodies grow scattered, in groups, or clusters on decaying, bark-free conifer wood. A snowbank fungus, it is most common at higher elevations after snowmelt in the spring. It is found in North America west of the Rocky Mountains. In 2010, it was recorded for the first time in Iran.

References

External links

Fungi described in 1901
Fungi of Asia
Fungi of North America
Snowbank fungi